Garra nambulica is a species of cyprinid fish in the genus Garra which is found only in Manipur.

References 

Garra
Fish described in 2005